

351001–351100 

|-bgcolor=#f2f2f2
| colspan=4 align=center | 
|}

351101–351200 

|-bgcolor=#f2f2f2
| colspan=4 align=center | 
|}

351201–351300 

|-bgcolor=#f2f2f2
| colspan=4 align=center | 
|}

351301–351400 

|-bgcolor=#f2f2f2
| colspan=4 align=center | 
|}

351401–351500 

|-bgcolor=#f2f2f2
| colspan=4 align=center | 
|}

351501–351600 

|-bgcolor=#f2f2f2
| colspan=4 align=center | 
|}

351601–351700 

|-bgcolor=#f2f2f2
| colspan=4 align=center | 
|}

351701–351800 

|-id=785
| 351785 Reguly ||  || Antal Reguly (1819–1858), a Hungarian linguist and ethnographer notable for his contribution to the study of Uralic languages || 
|}

351801–351900 

|-bgcolor=#f2f2f2
| colspan=4 align=center | 
|}

351901–352000 

|-id=976
| 351976 Borromini ||  || Francesco Borromini (1599–1667) a Swiss-born, Italian architect who was a leading figure in the early beginnings of Roman Baroque architecture. || 
|}

References 

351001-352000